The canton of Les Villages Vovéens (before November 2019: canton of Voves) is an administrative division of the Eure-et-Loir department, northern France. Its borders were modified at the French canton reorganisation which came into effect in March 2015. Its seat is in Les Villages Vovéens.

It consists of the following communes:
 
Allonnes
Baigneaux
Barmainville
Baudreville
Bazoches-en-Dunois
Bazoches-les-Hautes
Beauvilliers
Boisville-la-Saint-Père
Boncé
Bouville
Bullainville
Cormainville
Courbehaye
Dambron
Éole-en-Beauce
Fontenay-sur-Conie
Fresnay-l'Évêque
Le Gault-Saint-Denis
Gommerville
Gouillons
Guilleville
Guillonville
Intréville
Janville-en-Beauce
Levesville-la-Chenard
Loigny-la-Bataille
Louville-la-Chenard
Lumeau
Mérouville
Meslay-le-Vidame
Moutiers
Neuvy-en-Beauce
Neuvy-en-Dunois
Nottonville
Oinville-Saint-Liphard
Orgères-en-Beauce
Ouarville
Péronville
Poinville
Poupry
Prasville
Pré-Saint-Évroult
Pré-Saint-Martin
Réclainville
Rouvray-Saint-Denis
Sancheville
Santilly
Terminiers
Theuville
Tillay-le-Péneux
Toury
Trancrainville
Varize
Les Villages Vovéens
Villars
Vitray-en-Beauce
Ymonville

References

Cantons of Eure-et-Loir